Phyllonorycter froelichiella is a moth of the family Gracillariidae. It is found in all of Europe, except Greece.

The wingspan is 9–10 mm. Differs from L Nicellii as follows : forewings somewhat broader, more orange-tinged, markings more ochreous-tinged.

Adults are on wing from July to August in one generation in western Europe.

The larvae feed on Alnus glutinosa and Alnus incana, mining the leaves of their host plant. They create a large, lower-surface tentiform mine. The mine often occupies the entire space between two side veins, from the midrib almost to the leaf margin. There are no clear folds in the lower epidermis. Unlike other Phyllonorycter species that feed on Alnus, the larvae are grey (instead of white). The pupa is made in a light brown cocoon that is fastened to the roof of the mine.

References

External links
 
 Plant Parasites of Europe
 Phyllonorycter froelichiella at ukmoths

froelichiella
Moths described in 1839
Moths of Europe
Taxa named by Philipp Christoph Zeller